Panagiotis Spyropoulos (born 21 August 1992) is a Greek professional footballer who plays for as a right back for Super League 2 club Doxa Drama.

He has previously played for Panathinaikos, Panionios, Niki Volou on loan and Kalloni.

Club career
Spyropoulos started his career at Delta Ethniki side Aittitos Spata, from where Panionios snatched him in July 2010 and placed him in the club's under-20 team. In 2011, he joined Football League 2 side Niki Volou on loan from Panionios. On 27 August 2012, Spyropoulos made his Superleague debut for Panionios in a victorious season opener against Aris, a match where both teams used only Greek players in the starting lineups for the first time in a First Division match since 1990.

On 4 January 2013, Panathinaikos announced the signing of Spyropoulos in a 4 year-deal, but his contract would be valid on 1 June 2013, when the young defender's contract with Panionios was due to expire. Finally, on 31 January 2013, Spyropoulos signed with Panathinaikos. He spent three seasons with the "Greens" in which he made a total of just 20 appearances across all competitions. In September 2015, he moved to fellow Superleague side AEL Kalloni.

In July 2016, Spyropoulos dropped to the second level and signed a contract with Lamia, with whom he celebrated promotion at the end of the season. He made a contribution to the club's feat with 26 appearances, all of which as a starter. He then moved clubs again, signing with fellow Football League Doxa Drama in September 2017. On 10 September 2018, he signed a contract with newly promoted side Aittitos Spata on a free transfer.  On 27 October 2018, he scored in a 2-1 away loss against Platanias.

Personal life
Panagiotis shares the same last name as another full back who starred at Panionios, Greek international Nikos Spyropoulos.

Honours
Panathinaikos
 Greek Cup: 2014

References

External links

Profile at epae.org 

1992 births
Living people
Association football fullbacks
Super League Greece players
Panionios F.C. players
Niki Volos F.C. players
Panathinaikos F.C. players
AEL Kalloni F.C. players
PAS Lamia 1964 players
Doxa Drama F.C. players
Footballers from Athens
Greek footballers